Tondi Songway Kiini is a variety of Southern Songhai spoken in several villages in the area of Kikara, Mali, about 120 km west of Hombori. Westerners documented the existence of Tondi Songway Kiini in 1998.

References

Jeffrey Heath, 2005. Tondi Songway Kiini: Reference Grammar and TSK–English–French Dictionary

Songhay languages
Languages of Mali